The Men's snowboard big air competition at the FIS Freestyle Ski and Snowboarding World Championships 2021 was held on 16 March. A qualification was held on 14 March 2021.

Qualification
The qualification was started on 14 March at 09:40. The six best snowboarders from each heat qualified for the final.

Heat 1

Heat 2

Final
The final was started on 16 March at 13:30.

References

Men's snowboard big air